Nidda is a town in the district Wetterau, in Hesse, Germany.

Division of the town 
The municipality consists of the districts Unter-Widdersheim, Ober-Widdersheim, Borsdorf, Harb, Bad-Salzhausen, Geiß-Nidda, Ulfa, Stornfels, Eichelsdorf, Ober-Schmitten, Unter-Schmitten, Kohden, Nidda, Michelnau, Fauerbach, Wallernhausen, Schwickartshausen, Unter-Lais and Ober-Lais.

History 
Invited through a manifesto issued by Catherine the Great, several families from this region travelled to Russia in the late 18th century to settle in the Volga Region near Saratov. Family names Appel, Daubert, Pfaffenroth, Weitz and Scheuermann are examples of Volga Germans who helped to establish local villages, including Yagodnaya Polyana.

Nidda has a vibrant mix of people from many backgrounds, including Turkish, Russian and Pakistani. The Ahmadiyya Muslim Jamaat opened its first purpose-built mosque in Nidda in 2011.

Mayors
2022-     Thorsten Eberhard
2010–2022 Hans-Peter Seum
1995–2009 Lucia Puttrich
1989–1995 Helmut Jung
1961–1989 Wilhelm Eckhardt
1949–1961 August Ludwig Böcher
1910–1924 Ludwig Erk
1899–1910 Hermann Roth
1898–1899 Wilhelm Erk

Born in Nidda

 Ambrosius Pelargus (c. 1493 / 94-1561), theologian
 Johann Pistorius the Elder (Niddanus) (1504-1583), reformer and superintendent
 Johann Pistorius (Niddanus) (1546-1608), physician, historian and theologian
 Prince Charles William of Hesse-Darmstadt (1693-1707), Prince of Hesse-Darmstadt, obrist
 Salome Kammer (born 1959), actress, vocalist, singer and cellist

External links 

 Official site

References 

Wetteraukreis